Five Races Under One Union was one of the major principles upon which the Republic of China was founded in 1911 at the time of the Xinhai Revolution. Its central tenet was the harmonious existence under one nation of what were considered the five major ethnic groups in China: the Han, the Manchu, the Mongols, the Hui (including the Uyghurs), and the Tibetans.

Description
This principle emphasized harmony between what were considered the five major ethnic groups in China, as represented by the colored stripes of the Five-Colored Flag of the Republic: the Han (red); the Manchus (yellow); the Mongols (blue); the Hui (white); and the Tibetans (black).

The meaning of the term "Hui people" gradually shifted to its current sense—a group distinguished from Han Chinese by their Muslim faith and distant foreign ancestry—around 1911–49 in the Republic of China.

History
Historical records from the Sui dynasty show a system of military banners using the five colors to represent the Five Elements: red for fire, yellow for earth, blue for wood/wind, white for metal, and black for water. The Tang dynasty inherited this system, and has arranged the colors in a united flag according to the above order of the elements, for military use.
In the Liao and Song periods, the Khitan people used the same flag design, as depicted in Chinese painting. During the reign of the Mongol Yuan dynasty the five colors started to symbolize ethnicities in a multiethnic state.
In later historical periods, this "flag of the five united elements" was altered and readapted for military and official uses. A Qing dynasty painting depicting the Banners victory over the Muslim Du Wenxiu rebellion in Yunnan, includes a Qing military flag with the five elements arranged in the order of yellow, white, black, green and red.

After the Wuchang uprising, the Qing dynasty regime was replaced by the Republic of China. Prior to the adoption of the five colors flag by the Republic, a number of different flags were promoted by revolutionaries. For example, the military units of Wuchang wanted a 9-star flag featuring a Taijitu symbol, while Sun Yat-sen preferred the Blue Sky and White Sun flag to honor Lu Haodong.

Despite the uprisings targeting a Manchu-dominated regime, Sun Yat-sen, Song Jiaoren and Huang Xing unanimously advocated racial integration, which was symbolized by the five-color flag. They promoted a view of the non-Han ethnicities as also being Chinese, despite them being a relatively small percentage of the population.

The "five ethnic groups under one union" flag was no longer used after the Northern Expedition ended in 1928.

A variation of this flag was adopted by Yuan Shikai's empire and the Japanese puppet state of Manchukuo (see Flag of Manchukuo). In Manchukuo, a similar slogan (五族協和) was used, but the five races it represented were the Yamato (red), Han Chinese (blue), Mongols (white), Koreans (black) and Manchus (yellow). Some of its own variations also made the yellow more prominent, rather than display each color equally.

During the Second Sino-Japanese War, the flag was used by several Japanese puppet governments, including the Provisional Government of the Republic of China in the northern part of the country and the Reformed Government of the Republic of China in central China.

Gallery

China

Inner Manchuria

Inner Mongolia ("four races")

See also
Buddhist flag
Five Races Under One Union (Manchukuo)
Zhonghua minzu

Notes

References 

Chinese nationalism
Flags of China
Politics of the Republic of China (1912–1949)
Ideology of the Kuomintang
1911 Revolution
Flags displaying animals
Rainbow flags